United Nations Security Council resolution 514, adopted unanimously on 12 July 1982, after recalling Resolution 479 (1980) and noting the mediation efforts by the Secretary-General, Organisation of the Islamic Conference and the Non-Aligned Movement, the council expressed its deep concern at the prolonged conflict between Iran and Iraq.

Resolution 514 then called for a ceasefire between the two countries and a withdrawal by both to their internationally recognised border. It also asked the Secretary-General Javier Pérez de Cuéllar to continue with the mediation efforts and to report back to the council on attempts to implement the resolution within three months.

See also
 Iran–Iraq relations
 Iran–Iraq War
 List of United Nations Security Council Resolutions 501 to 600 (1982–1987)
 Resolutions 479, 522, 540, 552, 582, 588, 598, 612, 616, 619 and 620

References
Text of the Resolution at undocs.org

External links
 

 0514
 0514
1982 in Iran
1982 in Iraq
July 1982 events